The Ministry of Foreign Affairs is the government ministry of Guyana responsible for directing the nation's external relations and the operations of its international diplomatic missions. Hugh Todd has directed the ministry as Minister of Foreign Affairs since August 2020. The ministry is located in the capital city, Georgetown.

Diplomacy
Responsibilities of the ministry include the management of bilateral relations with individual nations and its representation in international organizations, including the United Nations and the Commonwealth of Nations, among others. It also oversees visas, work permits, and immigration affairs.

List of ministers
The following is a list of foreign ministers of Guyana since its founding in 1966:

See also
List of diplomatic missions of Guyana
Foreign relations of Guyana
Politics of Guyana

References

External links
Ministry of Foreign Affairs

Government of Guyana
Guyana
Guyana diplomacy-related lists